William Gilbert "Bill" Adams (June 17, 1923 – November 12, 2005), born St. John's, Newfoundland, was the ninth mayor of St. John's and a member of the Newfoundland and Labrador House of Assembly.

Adams educated at Bishop Feild College and Dalhousie University where he received his law degree in 1952. He returned to St. John's, where he articled with R. A. Parsons. He was elected Councillor in the St. John's municipal elections and held the position as Deputy Mayor from 1962 to 1965. In 1966 he was elected Mayor and held that position for eight years. He was named Queen's Counsel in 1963.

He married Eve Winsor.

Adams was elected to the House of Assembly in 1962 as a Liberal for the district of St. John's West. He resigned that position to take his job as Mayor. In June 1971 he was appointed Minister without Portfolio in the provincial government and became MHA for Twillingate in the 1971 general election.

Adams resigned from politics on March 1, 1972 and six years later was appointed to the bench as Judge with the Newfoundland District Court. In 1979, he was named chief justice in the district court.

He died in St. John's at the age of 82.

See also
List of people of Newfoundland and Labrador

References 

1923 births
2005 deaths
Mayors of St. John's, Newfoundland and Labrador
Schulich School of Law alumni
Liberal Party of Newfoundland and Labrador MHAs
Bishop Feild School alumni
Canadian King's Counsel